Joe Franco may refer to:

 Joey Franco (born 1951), American drummer
 Joe Franco (soccer) (born 1990), American soccer player